Manzoor Colony  is a neighborhood in Karachi East district of Karachi, Pakistan. It was previously administered as part of Jamshed Town, which was disbanded in 2011.

There are several ethnic groups in Manzoor Colony and they include Muhajirs, Baltis, Punjabis, Sindhis, Kashmiris, Seraikis, Pakhtuns, Hazaras, Memons, Bohras, Ismailis. There are nine sectors in Manzoor Colony A, B, C, D, E, F, G, H & I. Over 95% of the population are Muslims while there is also a small Christians and little Hindu population. The population of Jamshed Town is estimated to be nearly one million.

History
Manzoor colony was once a jungle where animals used to wander but first human settlements by Muazzam Ud Din Khan Niazi Khizar Khel from Khaglan Wala, Isakhel, Mianwali and Haji Muhammad  Luqman Siddiqui in 1960s made this area to liveable. It was once called Niazi Colony with a Chowk near Great Mosque Called Niazi Chowk but later name was changed after death of Muazzam ud Din Khan Niazi Khizar Khel and his descendants moved to Khanewal, Punjab in 1990.

Hamara Akhbar Manzoor Colony
 Hamara Akhbar Manzoor Colony.

References

External links
 Karachi Website.

Neighbourhoods of Karachi
Jamshed Town